Frome railway station serves a largely rural area of the county of Somerset in England, and is situated in the town of Frome. Most of the trains which take the loop line in order to serve Frome station are on the Bristol to Weymouth route, and most trains on the Reading to Taunton line by-pass the station on the main line.

History

Design 
Frome station was designed by J R Hannaford. It is one of the oldest through train shed railway stations still in operation in Britain. The station has two platforms, one of which is now unused due to the line being made into a single track. It is now a Grade II listed building.

Early history 
Frome station was originally on the Wilts, Somerset and Weymouth Railway, a railway that linked the Great Western Railway (GWR) at Chippenham with Weymouth. The line was authorised in 1845, was acquired by the GWR in 1850, reached Frome in the same year, and was completed throughout in 1857. The original route of this line is that of the loop line through Frome station. This line forms the basis for today's Bristol to Weymouth route.

A branch from Frome, authorised by the same act of 1845, opened to freight traffic in 1854, originally as a broad gauge mineral line to Radstock with a station at Mells Junction (renamed Mells Road in 1898).  It was converted to standard gauge in 1874 and opened to passenger traffic in 1875. At Radstock this line connected with the Bristol and North Somerset Railway, providing a more direct route to Bristol than that provided by the Wilts, Somerset and Weymouth Railway.  Sidings were created in Frome to service local industry: in the 1870s for the Cockey gasworks at Welshmill and the cattlemarket in the town centre, and then in the 1890s for the Cockey engineering works in Garston.

For the remainder of the 19th century, the GWR's principal route from London Paddington station to Exeter, Plymouth and Penzance was an indirect one via Bristol Temple Meads (the so-called Great Way Round). However, in 1895 the GWR directors announced that new lines were to be constructed to enable trains to reach Exeter, Plymouth and Penzance in a shorter time. This involved improvements to the  Berks and Hants Extension Railway and the Wilts, Somerset and Weymouth Line, together with the construction of the Castle Cary Cut-Off, which was opened from Castle Cary to the existing Bristol to Exeter line at Cogload Junction in 1906. This transformed Frome from a station on a secondary north to south line, to one on a main east to west route. The route resulting from these improvements and extensions forms the current London to Penzance line. In 1933 a by-pass route was constructed, enabling through traffic to avoid Frome station and the junction with the Radstock branch, and leaving the station on a looped branch as at present.

In 1925, there were nine or ten trains per day between Radstock and Frome with just two on Sundays. In 1956, this had reduced to only three, with none on a Sunday. The line to Radstock was formally closed in July 1988 by the removal of two rail lengths at Hapsford. The first part of the branch remains open to carry aggregate freight trains from Whatley Quarry. Colliery traffic from Radstock closed in 1973. This section of line is mainly used by Mendip Rail; Freightliner Group will take over the line in November 2019. After the branch near Great Elm to the quarry, the rest of the route to Radstock is now the route of National Cycle Route 24, otherwise known as the Colliers Way.

In February 2014, the station was refurbished. In December 2014 a plaque was installed at the station commemorating a journey made from Frome to London in 1912 by Leonard Woolf to propose marriage to writer Virginia Stephen. The journey to make the proposal, which was initially refused until a change of heart, was the start of one of the greatest literary partnerships of the twentieth century.

Stationmasters

William Hewitt Lindsey 1856  - 1865 (formerly station master at Solihull (1852) and Banbury (1854))
William Matthew Mitcham 1865 - 1895 (formerly station master at Bruton, afterwards station master at Bridport)
George Peach 1895 - 1920
John William Vatcher Bennett 1920 - 1925 (afterwards station master at Salisbury)
T.A. Leonard 1925 - 1935 (formerly station master at Lavington)
Charles A. Gallop 1935 - 1942
W.H. Gray 1942 - 1949 (formerly station master at Woodborough, afterwards station master at Warminster)
S.S. Taylor 1949 - 1950
A.E. Stowe from 1950 - 1953 (afterwards station master at Devizes)
Herbert Henry Soper 1953 - 1962
T.L. Powell ca. 1964

Accidents and incidents 
On 24 March 1987, a passenger train and a freight train were in a head-on collision due to the freight train passing a signal at danger. Locomotives 33 032 and 47 202 were severely damaged. Fifteen people were injured, some seriously.

Services 

The station is normally served by Bristol to  trains, although there are some services to/from Bristol and Cardiff which originate and terminate at Frome. There are also some trains to London Paddington. In 2019 additional Sunday services have been provided.

References

Railway stations in Somerset
Railway stations in Great Britain opened in 1850
Former Great Western Railway stations
Railway stations served by Great Western Railway
Railway stations served by South Western Railway
Grade II listed buildings in Mendip District
Grade II listed railway stations
Frome
DfT Category D stations